Rodney Cyril Sacks (born 1949) is a South African billionaire businessman, chairman, and CEO of Monster Beverage since 1990.

Early life
Rodney Cyril Sacks was born into a Lithuanian-Jewish family, he grew up in South Africa. His brother was art collector Leslie Sacks. He was educated at University of the Witwatersrand in Johannesburg and graduated with a law degree as well as a postgraduate higher diploma in tax law.

Career
Sacks worked as a lawyer in South Africa, and was the youngest person to be made a partner of Werksmans, the country's largest corporate law firm. In August 1989, Sacks emigrated to California with his family, having spent nearly 20 years with Werksmans and rising to become a senior partner.

In 1990, a consortium led by Sacks and his fellow South African, Hilton Schlosberg, acquired Hansen Natural Corporation, which in 1992 acquired Hansen's Natural Soda and Apple Juice for $14.5 million. Since 1990, Sacks has been chairman and CEO of Hansen Natural Corporation, which changed its name to Monster Beverage Corporation in 2012.

Personal life
Sacks and his family emigrated from South Africa to California in 1989. His sister Caron Sacks is married to Israeli politician Ze'ev Bielski, and is the mother of actress Adi Bielski. He is a supporter of Friends of the Israel Defense Forces.

References

1950 births
Living people
American billionaires
Rodney
South African billionaires